Marcus Hutter (born April 14, 1967 in Munich) is DeepMind Senior Scientist researching the mathematical foundations of artificial general intelligence.  He is on leave from his professorship at the ANU College of Engineering and Computer Science of the Australian National University in Canberra, Australia. Hutter studied physics and computer science at the Technical University of Munich. In 2000 he joined Jürgen Schmidhuber's group at the Istituto Dalle Molle di Studi sull'Intelligenza Artificiale (Dalle Molle Institute for Artificial Intelligence Research) in Manno, Switzerland. With others, he developed a mathematical theory of artificial general intelligence. His book Universal Artificial Intelligence: Sequential Decisions Based on Algorithmic Probability was published by Springer in 2005.

Research 

In 2002, Hutter, with Jürgen Schmidhuber and Shane Legg, developed and published a mathematical theory of artificial general intelligence, AIXI, based on idealised intelligent agents and reward-motivated reinforcement learning.

In 2005, Hutter and Legg published an intelligence test for artificial intelligence devices.

In 2009, Hutter developed and published the theory of feature reinforcement learning.

In 2014, Lattimore and Hutter published an asymptotically optimal extension of the AIXI agent.

Hutter Prize 

In 2006, Hutter announced the Hutter Prize for Lossless Compression of Human Knowledge, with a total of €50,000 in prize money. In 2020, Hutter raised the prize money for the Hutter Prize to €500,000.

Published works

References

Living people
Machine learning researchers
Artificial intelligence researchers
German computer scientists
Technical University of Munich alumni
Academic staff of the Australian National University
1967 births